Vasabha was a monarch of the Anuradhapura period of Sri Lanka. He is considered to be the pioneer of the construction of large-scale irrigation works and underground waterways in Sri Lanka to support paddy cultivation. 11 reservoirs and 12 canals were constructed during his reign. He also constructed several Buddhist temples in addition to renovating already existing ones. Vasabha started a new dynasty in the history of Sri Lankan monarchs, having seized the throne after killing Subharaja, the then ruler of Anuradhapura.

Early life and kingship
Prince Vasabha, born to a family of a clan named Lambakanna, spent his childhood in a village in the North of the country working for his uncle who was a general in the king's army. The ruler of the country at this time was Subharaja, who was informed by soothsayers that one named Vasabha would defeat him and become king. To avoid this, Subharaja ordered everyone in the country bearing that name to be kill me. Vasabha's uncle tried to take him to the king under the pretext of taking him to join the king's service. However, he was saved by Pottha, the wife of his uncle, who told him about the king's decision. He went into hiding followed this, and gathered an army in secret.

Having eventually raised an army, Vasabha led a rebellion against the king, and subsequently seized the throne in 67 AD after killing Subharaja and his uncle. He ruled for 44 years, until his death in 111 AD. His accession to the throne marked the beginning of a new dynasty of rulers, known as the First Lambakanna Dynasty after the name of his clan.

Services
The ancient chronicle Mahavamsa states that he constructed eleven reservoirs and twelve canals to distribute water from them. His most notable construction is the Elahara canal or 
It was created by damming the Amban river, and was used to divert water in a westerly direction for agricultural use. Due to such constructions, Vasabha pioneered the construction of large irrigation works in the country.

Having been told by a soothsayer that he would live only for twelve more years, Vasabha became a devout Buddhist and performed many meritorious acts in an effort to prolong his life. He constructed several Buddhist temples, and renovated others. Among his constructions are the vatadage at Thuparama and some additions to the Mahavihara.

Inscriptions
Inscriptions belonging to the reign of King Vasabha such as the Vallipuram Gold Plate in the Jaffna peninsula in the north which mentions about a minister named Isigiraye was appointed to" Nakadiva", which was then Jaffna. Situlpawwa and Tissamaharama in the south, Batticaloa District of the east and Kurunegala District of the west all prove that King Vasaba's power had spread through the island.

See also
 List of Sri Lankan monarchs

References

External links
Chapter 35 of the Mahavamsa, which describes Vasabha's rule

Sinhalese kings
Monarchs of Anuradhapura
House of Lambakanna I
1st-century Sinhalese monarchs
2nd-century Sinhalese monarchs
 Sinhalese Buddhist monarchs